Mujer (Spanish  for "woman"), La Mujer ("the woman") or Una Mujer ("a woman") may refer to:

Film and TV
Mujer (film), 1946 Mexican film
Una Mujer, a 1975 Argentine film starring Cipe Lincovsky
Una mujer (1965 TV series), broadcast by Telesistema Mexicano
Una mujer (1978 TV series), broadcast by Televisa
Una mujer, 1991 telenovela broadcast by Ecuavisa
Mujer, 1970 Argentine TV series starring Tito Alonso

Music
Mujer (album), 1993 album by Marta Sánchez
La Mujer, 1989 album by Shirley Bassey
Una Mujer (album), 2003 album by Myriam
Una Mujer, album by Olga Tañón
 "Una Mujer", a song by Cetu Javu from the album Where Is Where
"Una Mujer", the Spanish version of Christina Agulilera's "What a Girl Wants"

See also
Mujeres (disambiguation)